Cleistosphinctes is an extinct cephalopod genus from the ammonite order that lived during the Middle Jurassic.

Cleistosphinctes, named by Arkell, 1953, and included in the family Perisphinctidae and superfamily Perisphinctaceae, is small, compressed, evolute, with long secondary ribs and very large asymmetric spatulate lappets that embrace the sides of the preceding whorl.

References

Treatise on Invertebrate Paleontology, Part L Ammonoidea; Geological Society of America and Univ of Kansas press, 5th printing, 1990. (p. L314)

Jurassic ammonites
Ammonites of Europe
Bajocian life